Mizuhashi (written: 水橋 lit. "water bridge") is a Japanese surname. Notable people with the surname include:

, Japanese voice actress
, Japanese actor
, Japanese singer

See also
Mizuhashi Station, a railway station in Toyama, Toyama Prefecture, Japan

Japanese-language surnames